Thierry Etouayo (born 29 July 1977) is a Congolese footballer. He played in five matches for the Congo national football team from 1994 to 2001. He was also named in Congo's squad for the 2000 African Cup of Nations tournament.

References

1977 births
Living people
Republic of the Congo footballers
Republic of the Congo international footballers
2000 African Cup of Nations players
Place of birth missing (living people)
Association football goalkeepers
ASEC Mimosas players
FC Rouen players
Jura Sud Foot players
Republic of the Congo expatriate footballers
Republic of the Congo expatriate sportspeople in France
Expatriate footballers in France